is a district located in Kōchi Prefecture, Japan.

As of October 10, 2018, the district has an estimated population of 26,601 and a density of 33.09 persons per km2. The total area is 803.67 km2.

Towns and villages 

Ino
Niyodogawa

Mergers 
On October 1, 2004 the village of Gohoku, along with the village of Hongawa, from Tosa District, merged into the expanded town of Ino.
On August 1, 2005 the town of Ikegawa, and the village of Agawa merged with the village of Niyodo, from Takaoka District, to form the new town of Niyodogawa.
On January 1, 2008 the town of Haruno merged into the expanded city of Kōchi.

References

Districts in Kōchi Prefecture